Three Men in the Snow (Czech: Tri muzi ve snehu) is a 1936 Czech comedy film directed by  Vladimír Slavínský and starring Hugo Haas, Věra Ferbasová and Jindřich Plachta. It is based on the novel of the same title by Erich Kästner.

The film's sets were designed by the art director Štěpán Kopecký.

Cast
 Hugo Haas as Továrník Eduard Bárta 
 Věra Ferbasová as Vera Bártová 
 Jindřich Plachta as Jan Náprstek 
 Zdeňka Baldová as Julie Hubácková 
 Vladimír Borský as Dr. Obch. véd. Jaroslav Hájek 
 Ella Nollová as Jeho matka 
 František Paul as Reditel hotelu 
 Theodor Pistek as Vrátný v Imperialu 
 Míla Reymonová as Pani Kasperová 
 Vlasta Hrubá as Paní Severová 
 Jaroslav Marvan as Director of Barta's Works

See also 
 A Rare Bird (1935)
 Paradise for Three (1938)
 Three Men in the Snow (1955)
 Three Men in the Snow (1974)

References

Bibliography 
 Goble, Alan. The Complete Index to Literary Sources in Film. Walter de Gruyter, 1999.

External links 
 

1936 films
Czech comedy films
1936 comedy films
1930s Czech-language films
Films directed by Vladimír Slavínský
Czechoslovak black-and-white films
Films based on works by Erich Kästner
1930s Czech films